Optical pickup system may refer to: